Moritz Sommerauer né Moritz Moser (born 27 August 1992) is an Austrian footballer who plays for German club Wacker Burghausen.

Personal life
Moritz changed his last name from Moser to Sommerauer after his marriage.

References

External links

1992 births
Living people
Austrian footballers
Association football fullbacks
SV Wacker Burghausen players
TSV Buchbach players
TSV 1860 Rosenheim players
3. Liga players
Regionalliga players
Oberliga (football) players
Austrian expatriate footballers
Expatriate footballers in Germany
Austrian expatriate sportspeople in Germany